The 1936–37 Northern Football League season was the 44th in the history of the Northern Football League, a football competition in Northern England.

Clubs

The league featured 13 clubs which competed in the last season, along with one new club:
 Crook Town, joined from the North Eastern League

League table

References

1936-37
4